A trophozoite (G. trope, nourishment + zoon, animal) is the activated, feeding stage in the life cycle of certain protozoa such as malaria-causing Plasmodium falciparum and those of the Giardia group. (The complement of the trophozoite state is the thick-walled cyst form).

Life cycle stages

Trophozoite and cyst stages are shown in the life cycle of Balantidium coli the causative agent of balantidiasis.

In the apicomplexan life cycle the trophozoite undergoes schizogony (asexual reproduction) and develops into a schizont which contains merozoites.

The trophozoite life stage of Giardia colonizes and proliferates in the small intestine. Trophozoites develop during the course of the infection into cysts which is the infectious life stage.

References

Parasitology